Gauge vector–tensor gravity (GVT) is a relativistic generalization of Mordehai Milgrom's modified Newtonian dynamics (MOND) paradigm where gauge fields cause the MOND behavior. The former covariant realizations of MOND such as the Bekenestein's tensor–vector–scalar gravity and the Moffat's scalar–tensor–vector gravity attribute MONDian behavior to some scalar fields.  GVT is the first example wherein the MONDian behavior is mapped to the gauge vector fields.
The main features of GVT can be summarized as follows:
 As it is derived from the action principle, GVT respects conservation laws;
 In the weak-field approximation of the spherically symmetric, static solution, GVT reproduces the MOND acceleration formula;
 It can accommodate gravitational lensing.
 It is in total agreement with the Einstein–Hilbert action in the strong and Newtonian gravities.
Its dynamical degrees of freedom are:
 Two gauge fields:  ;
 A metric, .

Details

The physical geometry, as seen by particles, represents the Finsler geometry–Randers type:

 

This implies that the orbit of a particle with mass  can be derived from the following effective action:

The geometrical quantities are Riemannian. GVT, thus, is a bi-geometric gravity.

Action
The metric's action coincides to that of the Einstein–Hilbert gravity:

 

where  is the Ricci scalar constructed out from the metric. The action of the gauge fields follow:

 

where L has the following MOND asymptotic behaviors

and  represent the coupling constants of the theory while  are the parameters of the theory and

Coupling to the matter
Metric couples to the energy-momentum tensor. The matter current is the source field of both gauge fields. The matter current is

where  is the density and  represents the four velocity.

Regimes of the GVT theory
GVT accommodates the Newtonian and MOND regime of gravity; but it admits the post-MONDian regime.

Strong and Newtonian regimes
The strong and Newtonian regime of the theory is defined to be where holds:

The consistency between the gravitoelectromagnetism approximation to the GVT theory and that predicted and measured by the Einstein–Hilbert gravity demands that 

which results in 
 

So the theory coincides to the Einstein–Hilbert gravity in its Newtonian and strong regimes.

MOND regime
The MOND regime of the theory is defined to be

So the action for the  field becomes aquadratic. For the static mass distribution, the theory then converts to the AQUAL model of gravity with the critical acceleration of

So the GVT theory is capable of reproducing the flat rotational velocity curves of galaxies. The current observations do not fix  which is supposedly of order one.

Post-MONDian regime 
The MOND type behavior is suppressed in this regime due to the contribution of the second gauge field.

See also
 Dark energy
 Dark fluid
 Dark matter
 General theory of relativity
 Law of universal gravitation
 Modified Newtonian dynamics
 Nonsymmetric gravitational theory
 Pioneer anomaly
 Scalar – scalar field
 Scalar–tensor–vector gravity
 Tensor
 Vector

References

Theories of gravity
Theoretical physics
Astrophysics